Roy Lewis, Jr. (born May 19, 1985) is a former American football cornerback. He was signed by the Pittsburgh Steelers as an undrafted free agent in 2008. He played college football at Washington. With the Steelers, he won Super Bowl XLIII against the Arizona Cardinals. He is now a firefighter for the  City of Phoenix in Arizona.

College career
Lewis was named a team captain as a senior at Washington, initially enrolled at San Jose State but transferred to Washington following his freshman year; eventually he earned a major in American ethnic studies. He was named Pac-10 defensive player of the week and the team's defensive MVP after the win over Boise State in 2007. Lewis, who played linebacker and cornerback in high school and college, impressed Steelers coach Mike Tomlin with his physical play, leading the coaching staff to give him an opportunity at the safety position.

Professional career

Pittsburgh Steelers
Lewis was signed by the Steelers as an undrafted rookie free agent on April 28, 2008. After playing 1 game with the team in 2008, Lewis spent the 2009 preseason with the Steelers before being cut on September 4, 2009.  He was activated on October 28.

Seattle Seahawks
Lewis was claimed off waivers by the Seahawks on September 6, 2009.  He was activated on October 28. Following the 2010 season, Lewis was presented with the Steve Largent Award and the team's Man of the Year Award.

References

External links
Seattle Seahawks bio
Washington Huskies bio

1985 births
Living people
Players of American football from Los Angeles
American football cornerbacks
San Jose State Spartans football players
Washington Huskies football players
Pittsburgh Steelers players
Seattle Seahawks players
Baltimore Ravens players